This is a summary of the year 2018 in British music.

Events
 2 January – The Paxton Festival announces that Helen Jamieson is to stand down as its artistic director in September 2018.
 8 January – Arts Council England announces the appointment of Claire Mera-Nelson as Director of Music and as director in its London office.
 10 January – The Royal Philharmonic Orchestra announces the resignation of Charles Dutoit as its principal conductor and artistic adviser, with immediate effect, following allegations against Dutoit of inappropriate sexual behaviour.  Dutoit had previously been scheduled to vacate the posts in 2019.
 11 January – Sinfonia Viva announces the appointment of Frank Zielhorst as its new principal conductor, with immediate effect.
 15 January – The Cumnock Tryst announces the appointment of Jean Nicholson as its new festival director.
 18 January – The Southbank Centre announces that Jude Kelly is to stand down as its artistic director, effective May 2018.
 25 January – Creative Scotland announces the newest round of Regular Funding recipients for its next three-year programme, which includes the losses of £300,000 for the Dunedin Consort and of £550,000 for the Hebrides Ensemble.
 26 January – King's College, Cambridge announces that Stephen Cleobury is to retire as its Director of Music, effective 30 September 2019.
 1 February
 The Buxton Festival announces the appointment of Michael Williams as its next chief executive officer, effective April 2018.
 The BBC Scottish Symphony Orchestra, under the direction of Martyn Brabbins, gives the first performance of the Symphony in B♭ by Michael Tippett since its 1935 premiere.
 2 February – Following the release of his debut album Inspiration, Sheku Kanneh-Mason becomes the first-ever BBC Young Musician winner to enter the Official UK Albums Chart with a debut recording.
 6 February – Creative Scotland announces restoration of £300,000 funding for 3 years to the Dunedin Consort.
 11 February – 50 years after its composition, Richard Reason's Dylan Thomas Song Cycle receives its first performance at Conway Hall.
 20 February – Longborough Festival Opera announces the appointment of Polly Graham, daughter of festival founders Martin and Lizzie Graham,  as its new artistic director, with immediate effect.
 22 February – A news report states that Rafael Payare is to stand down as music director of the Ulster Orchestra as of the end of his current contract, at the close of the 2018–2019 season.
 7 March – NME announces that it is to discontinue its print edition, and to shift its publication emphasis to its online edition.
 8 March
 English National Opera announces the appointment of Stuart Murphy as its next chief executive, effective 3 April 2018.
 Trinity Laban Conservatoire of Music and Dance announces its 'Venus Blazing' programme for the 2018–2019 academic year, with the commitment that music by female composers is to comprise at least 50% of the selections for its public performances.
 14 March – The Royal Society of Musicians announces the appointment of Charlotte Penton-Smith as its first ever chief executive.
 24 March – Glyndebourne announces the prize winners of its inaugural Glyndebourne Opera Cup competition:
 Overall winner: Samantha Hankey
 Second place: Jacquelyn Stucker
 Third place: Elbenita Kajtazi
 Ginette Theano prize (for most promising talent): Emily Pogorelc
 Media prize: Samantha Hankey
 Audience prize: Elbenita Kajtazi
 28 March – The High Court of Justice rules in favour of violist Christopher Goldscheier in his lawsuit against the Royal Opera House, Covent Garden, for hearing damage from 'acoustic shock'.
 4 April – The Royal Philharmonic Society announces the appointment of James Murphy as its next chief executive, effective in the summer of 2018.
 5 April – The Buxton International Festival announces that its artistic director, Stephen Barlow, is to stand down from the post in late July 2018.
 21 April – The Queen's Birthday Party, a music concert celebrating the 92nd birthday of Queen Elizabeth II, is held at London's Royal Albert Hall.
 27 April – It is announced that Ralph Fiennes is to star in a new film about the life of George Frederic Handel, directed by Chris Addison.
 13 May – Lauren Zhang is announced as the winner of the BBC Young Musician 2018 competition.
 19 May – The Wedding of Prince Harry and Meghan Markle features such musicians as:
 Choir of St George's Chapel, Windsor Castle
 The Kingdom Choir
 The State Trumpeters of the Household Cavalry
 Elin Manahan Thomas
 Sheku Kanneh-Mason
 David Blackadder
 Orchestral musicians from the BBC National Orchestra of Wales, the English Chamber Orchestra and the Philharmonia Orchestra, conducted by Christopher Warren-Green
 23 May – King's College, Cambridge announces the appointment of Daniel Hyde as its next Director of Music, effective 1 October 2019.
 29 May – The Scottish Chamber Orchestra announces the appointment of Maxim Emelyanychev as its next principal conductor, effective with the 2019–2020 season.
 1 June – The Royal Philharmonic Society (RPS) announces its awarding of honorary membership in the RPS to Stephen Hough, the 141st such recipient in the history of the RPS.
 7 June – Thea Musgrave receives The Queen's Medal for Music 2017, in a private audience with HRH Queen Elizabeth II.
 8 June – Queen's Birthday Honours
 Dame Kiri Te Kanawa is made a Companion of Honour.
 Simon Keenlyside is made a Knight Bachelor.
 Thomas Adès, Kanya King, and Gillian Moore are each made a Commander of the Order of the British Empire.
 Alice Coote, Julian Joseph, and Debbie Wiseman are each made an Officer of the Order of the British Empire.
 Susannah Eastburn, Rosemary Johnson, Ms. Dynamite (Niomi McLean-Daley), Orphy Robinson, and Dennis Rollins are each made a Member of the Order of the British Empire.
 8–10 June – Download Festival 2018 takes place at Donington Park in Leicestershire. The main stage is headlined by Avenged Sevenfold, Guns N' Roses and Ozzy Osbourne, the Zippo encore stage by You Me at Six, Parkway Drive and Rise Against, the Avalanche stage by Bad Religion, Neck Deep and The Hives, and the Dogtooth stage by Tesseract, Thy Art Is Murder and Baroness.
 26 June – Southbank Sinfonia announces the appointment of William Norris as its next managing director, effective July 2018.
 2 July
 The Royal Philharmonic Orchestra announces the appointment of Vasily Petrenko as its new music director, effective with the 2021–2022 season, with an initial contract of 5 years.
 The Royal Liverpool Philharmonic Orchestra (RLPO) announces that Vasily Petrenko is to conclude his tenure as its chief conductor as of the end of the 2020–2021 season, and subsequently to take the title of conductor laureate of the RLPO.
 4 July – The Susan Chilcott Scholarship announces soprano Gemma Summerfield as the final recipient of the Chilcott Award.
 9 July – ORA Singers announces the appointment of Stephen Fry as its new president.
13 July – The Lightning Seeds' single "Three Lions" reaches number one in the UK singles chart for the fourth time following England's achievements in the 2018 FIFA World Cup, making it the only song to reach number one on four separate occasions with the same artist lineup. By the following week the single has plummeted to number 97, setting a record for the fastest ever fall from the top of the charts.
 26 July – The Academy of Ancient Music announces that Richard Egarr is to stand down as its music director at the close of the 2020-2021 season.
 August – In 2019, streaming platform Spotify reveals that Welsh duo Alffa is the "most streamed Welsh language act ever" with three million streams for their two singles.
 9 August – Glyndebourne Festival Opera announces the appointment of Stephen Langridge as its next artistic director, effective in the spring of 2019.
 31 August – The Leeds International Piano Competition announces the appointment of Fiona Sinclair as its next chief executive, eff3ective 1 October 2018.
 6 September – Welsh National Opera announces the appointment of Aidan Lang as its next general director, effective July 2019.
 20 September – Wolf Alice are revealed as winners of the 2018 Mercury Prize for their second album Visions of a Life.
 4 October – The BBC Philharmonic announces the appointment of Omer Meir Wellber as its next chief conductor, effective with the 2019-2020 season, with an initial contract of 4 years.
 27 October – The Mass Via Victrix of Sir Charles Villiers Stanford receives its first-ever complete performance, 99 years after its composition, in Cardiff by the BBC National Orchestra of Wales, the BBC National Chorus of Wales, and vocal soloists Kiandra Howarth, Jess Dancy, Ruairi Bowen, and Gareth Brynmor John.
 5 November – The Dartington International Summer School and Festival announces the appointment of Sara Mohr-Pietsch as its next artistic director, effective January 2019, with her first programmed season scheduled to occur in 2020.
 6 November – Glyndebourne Festival Opera announces the appointment of Ben Glassberg as the new principal conductor of the Glyndebourne Tour, with an initial contract of 3 years.
 23 November – The Donatella Flick LSO Conducting Competition 2018 announces Felix Mildenberger as its winner, which includes the appointment of Mildenberger as the new assistant conductor of the London Symphony Orchestra for a 2-year period.
 26 November – The Royal Northern College of Music announces the appointment of Sara Ascenso as its first-ever lecturer in Musicians' Health and Wellbeing, the first UK music institution ever to institute such a post.
 3 December – Chetham's School of Music announces the appointment of Tom Redmond as its next director of music, effective September 2019.
 4 December – The Philharmonia Orchestra announces that Esa-Pekka Salonen is to stand down as its principal conductor after the close of the 2020-2021 season.
 19 December – The Royal Scottish National Orchestra announces the appointment of Alistair Mackie as its next chief executive, effective April 2019.
 28 December – New Year's Honours:
 Nicola Benedetti, Nick Mason, and Nitin Sawhney are each made a Commander of the Order of British Empire.
 Christian Blackshaw, Stephen Darlington, Gordon Giltrap, David Hill, Jacqueline Tyler, and Neil Warnock are each made a Member of the Order of the British Empire.
 Shirley Thompson is made an Officer of the Order of the British Empire.

Television programmes
23 February – The Old Grey Whistle Test – one-off special episode
6 April–4 May – Sounds Like Friday Night – Series 2
8 May–12 June – Later... with Jools Holland – Series 52

Artists and groups reformed 
BBMak
The Bluebells
The Kinks
Late of the Pier
Spice Girls
Westlife
The Zutons

Groups disbanded 
 Chas & Dave
 The Fall
 Frightened Rabbit
 Hookworms
 Runrig
 Splashh
 Spring King
 The Strypes
 Thumpers
 Ultimate Painting
 Wild Beasts

Classical works
 Richard Barnard – In Cambridge Town
 Iain Bell – Aurora
 Harrison Birtwistle – Keyboard Engine
 Bishi – The Good Immigrant
 Mark David Boden – Clarinet Concerto
 Laura Bowler – /ˌfɛmɪˈnɪnɪti/.
 Rory Boyle – Songs of the Marshes
 Charlotte Bray – Reflections in Time
 Ewan Campbell – Frail Skies
 Joe Cutler – Elsewhereness
 Jonathan Dove – The Kerry Christmas Carol
 Brian Elias – L'innominata
 Samantha Fernando – Formations
 Cheryl Frances-Hoad
 Between the Skies, the River and the Hills (piano concerto)
 Last Man Standing (text by Tamsin Collison) 
 Alex Gowan-Webster – Cantio Invocatione
 Helen Grime (music) and Fiona Benson (texts) – Bright Travellers
 Helen Grime – Woven Space
 Simon Holt
 Llanto (para las chumberas) (Lament [for the prickly pears])
 4th Quartet ('Cloud House') 
 Thomas Hyde
 Symphony
 Les at Leisure (comedy overture)
 Sarah Jenkins – And the sun stood still
 Nicola LeFanu (music) and Wendy Cope (text) – St Hilda of Whitby
 Benedict Mason – Ricochet
 Christian Mason – Man Made
 David Matthews – Symphony No 9
 Anna Meredith – Five Telegrams
 Stephen Montague
 Beguiled (for solo piano)
 Hound Dog Blues
 Thea Musgrave
 La Vida es Sueño
 Whirlwind
 Roxanna Panufnik – Songs of Darkness, Dreams of Light
 Francis Pott – Ardor Amoris
 Stephen Pratt – Symphonies of Time and Tide
Deborah Pritchard – River Above
 Guto Puw – Camouflage
 Rebecca Saunders
 Unbreathed (for string quartet)
 O, Yes & I
 Dobrinka Tabakova – Tectonic
 Joby Talbot – Ink Dark Moon (Guitar Concerto)
 Bramwell Tovey – Sinfonia Della Passione
 Philip Venables 
 The Gender Agenda
 Venables Plays Bartók (violin concerto)
 Errollyn Wallen – Concerto for Violin, Viola and Accordion
 Huw Watkins – Spring
 Lara Weaver – Christus factus est
 Judith Weir – Piano Quintet (A Song of Departure)
 Alison Willis – A Light Not Yet Ready to Go Out
 Alex Woolf (music) and Gillian Clarke (new text) – Requiem

Opera
 Sir George Benjamin and Martin Crimp – Lessons in Love and Violence
 Tansy Davies and Nick Drake – The Cave
 Emily Howard and Selma Dimitrijevic – To See the Invisible
 Elena Langer and Emma Jenkins – Rhondda Rips It Up!
 David Sawer and Rory Mullarkey – The Skating Rink
 Mark-Anthony Turnage and Rory Mullarkey – Coraline

Musical theatre
Sylvia, with music by DJ Walde and Josh Cohen.

Musical films
Been So Long, starring Michaela Coel 
Bohemian Rhapsody, starring Rami Malek, with music by Queen
 Mamma Mia! Here We Go Again, starring Lily James, Julie Walters and Colin Firth, with music by ABBA.

Film scores and incidental music

Film
Howard Goodall – Johnny English Strikes Again
Steven Price – Ophelia

Television
Isobel Waller-Bridge 
The ABC Murders
Vanity Fair

British music awards
Brit Awards – see 2018 Brit Awards

British Composer Awards
 Amateur or Young Performers: Oliver Searle – Microscopic Dances
 Chamber Ensemble: James Weeks – Libro di fiammelle e ombre
 Choral: Judith Weir – In the Land of Uz
 Community or Educational Project: Liam Taylor-West – The Umbrella
 Jazz Composition for Large Ensemble: Cassie Kinoshi – Afronaut
 Jazz Composition for Small Ensemble: Simon Lasky – Close to Ecstasy
 Orchestral: Sir Harrison Birtwistle – Deep Time
 Small Chamber: Rebecca Saunders – Inbreathed
 Solo or Duo: Dominic Murcott – The Harmonic Canon
 Sonic Art: Emily Peasgood – Halfway to Heaven
 Stage Works: Oliver Coates – Shoreline
 Wind Band or Brass Band: Simon Dobson – The Turing Test
 British Composer Award for Innovation: Trevor Wishart
 British Composer Award for Inspiration: Sally Beamish

Charts and sales

Deaths

 1 January – Peter Evans, music scholar and expert on the music of Benjamin Britten, 88
 2 January – Tony Calder, record executive, producer and manager, 74
 4 January – Ray Thomas, founding member of The Moody Blues, flautist, singer and composer, 76
 10 January – Eddie Clarke, better known as "Fast" Eddie Clarke, guitarist and member of heavy metal bands Fastway and Motörhead, 67. Of Motörhead's classic lineup, which consisted of Lemmy, himself and Phil "Philthy Animal" Taylor, he was the last surviving member.
 16 January – Dave Holland, drummer (Trapeze), 69
 20 January – Jim Rodford, bass guitarist for Argent, The Kinks and The Zombies, 76
 24 January – Mark E. Smith, vocalist and frontman and the only constant member of The Fall, 60
 10 February – Raimund Herincx, baritone, 90
 19 February – Stormin (born Shaun Lewis), grime and drum and bass MC, 34  
 23 February – Eddy Amoo, singer for The Real Thing, 74
 11 March – Ken Dodd, singer, comedian, actor, 90
 28 March – Philip De Groote, South African-born cellist and founding member of the Chilingirian Quartet, 68
 15 April – Peter Lloyd, orchestral flautist, 86
 9–10 May (confirmed 11 May) – Scott Hutchison, singer, songwriter, musician Frightened Rabbit, 36
 1 June – Andrew Massey, conductor based in America, 72
 8 June - Danny Kirwan, guitarist, songwriter (Fleetwood Mac), 68
 12 June – Jon Hiseman, drummer, 73
 2 July - Alan Longmuir, bassist (Bay City Rollers), 70
 8 July – Oliver Knussen, classical composer, 66
 9 August – Arthur Davies, operatic tenor, 77
 24 August – James Mallinson, British classical recording engineer, 75
 1 September – Kenneth Bowen, Welsh tenor, 86
 22 September – Chas Hodges, musician (Chas & Dave), 74 (organ failure)
 1 October – Ben Daglish, 52, English composer and musician, lung cancer.
 2 October – Geoff Emerick, recording engineer (Abbey Road Studios, The Beatles), multi-Grammy winner, 72
 4 October – John Tyrrell, 76, musicologist.
7 October – John Wicks, 65, producer, singer and musician (The Records).
 25 October – Martin Dalby, composer and music administrator, 76
6 November – Hugh McDowell, 65, cellist (Electric Light Orchestra)
16 November
Alec Finn, 74, English-born Irish bouzouki player (De Dannan).
Al James, 73, bass player (Showaddywaddy)
 17 November – Richard Baker, news reader and BBC classical music television presenter, 94
20 November
Levine Andrade, 64, Indian-born violinist and founding member of the Arditti Quartet.
Roy Bailey, 83, English folk singer.
28 November – Gary Haisman, 60, English musician.
6 December – Pete Shelley. 63, singer, musician (Buzzcocks), heart attack.

See also 
 2018 in British radio
 2018 in British television
 2018 in the United Kingdom

References 

 
2018